The 2010 Conference USA men's soccer tournament was the sixteenth edition of the Conference USA Men's Soccer Tournament. The tournament decided the Conference USA champion and guaranteed representative into the 2010 NCAA Division I Men's Soccer Championship. The tournament was hosted by the University of Memphis and the games were played at the Mike Rose Soccer Complex.

Bracket

Schedule

Quarterfinals

Semifinals

Final

Statistics

Goalscorers

Own goal
(UAB scored for South Carolina)

Awards

All-Tournament team
Craig Hill, SMU
Arthur Ivo, SMU
Blake Brettschneider, South Carolina
Stephen Morrissey, South Carolina
Kevin Stam, South Carolina
Will Traynor, South Carolina
Hunter Christiansen, Tulsa
Jake Dobkins, Tulsa
Ashley McInnes, Tulsa
Warren Creavalle, UCF
Camilo Rendon, UCF

References

External links
 

Conference USA Men's Soccer Tournament
Tournament
Conference USA Men's Soccer Tournament
Conference USA Men's Soccer Tournament